"Sorry" is a single by the English ska band Madness, released in March 2007 as a stand-alone single, not included on any album.  Unusually for Madness, it is a song that was written for them by outside writers—all previous Madness singles had been either original compositions by the band, or covers of previously existing tunes.  "Sorry" was given to them by their new management group to fill the gap between The Dangermen Sessions Vol. 1 and The Liberty of Norton Folgate; Madness themselves worked on the song enough to gain a co-writer credit on the finished track.

In an attempt to gain more air play from a variety of radio stations, two different versions of the song were issued. One version featured just the band, while a second featured an interlude from UK rap artists Sway DaSafo and Baby Blue.

The band brought it out via their own label Lucky 7 Records, entering the UK chart at #23 on Sunday 11 March 2007, their highest UK chart single entry since "Lovestruck" in 1999. The single also went to #1 on the UK Indie Chart.  At the time, guitarist Chris Foreman had left Madness, and does not feature on the single or the video.  This is the only Madness track Foreman does not appear on.

Track listing
7" vinyl single

CD single

Use in popular culture
The version featuring Sway and Baby Blue has featured in FIFA 08.

Chart performance

References

Madness (band) songs
2007 singles
Lucky 7 Records singles
Song recordings produced by Clive Langer
Song recordings produced by Alan Winstanley
2006 songs